Chalastra pellurgata, also known as the brown fern moth or the pale fern looper, is a moth of the family Geometridae. This species was first described by Francis Walker in 1862. It is endemic to New Zealand and can be found throughout the country. It inhabits native forest. This species is extremely variable both in its larval and adult life stage. Larvae of this species are active during spring and summer. They  feed on the fronds of fern species. C. pellurgata pupates by forming a thin cocoon on the soil amongst leaf litter and moss. Adults are on the wing throughout the year but are most common from September to March. During the day adult moths can be observed resting on dead fern fronds. They become active from dusk and are attracted to light.

Taxonomy 
This species was first described by Francis Walker in 1862 using a specimen collected in Nelson by T. R. Oxley and named Chalastra pellurgata. In 1875 Cajetan von Felder and Alois Friedrich Rogenhofer, thinking they were describing a new species, named this species Itama cinerascens. In May 1884 Edward Meyrick, thinking he was also describing a new species, named this species Stratocleis streptophora. Later in 1884 and in more detail in 1885 Meyrick discussed this species under the name C. pelurgata. This was an unjustified emendation. In those publications Meyrick synonymised both Itama cinerascens and Stratocleis streptophora into C. pelurgata. In 1898 George Hudson described and illustrated this species under the name C. pelurgata following Meyrick. In 1917 Meyrick, again using the epithet pelurgata, placed the species in the genus Selidosema. In 1928 Hudson illustrated and discussed the species, again following Meyrick, using the name Selidosema pelurgata. In 1988 John S. Dugdale placed this species back into the genus Chalastra and discussed Meyrick's unjustified emendation of the species epithet. This placement was accepted in the New Zealand Inventory of Biodiversity. The female holotype is held at the Natural History Museum, London.

Description 

Hudson described the egg of C. pellurgata as follows:

The larvae of this moth were described by Hudson as being: 

C. pellurgata larvae pupate on the surface of the soil under their host plants in a loose cocoon.

Hudson described this species as follows:

Hudson pointed out that this is an extremely variable species, with some male specimens being darker and marked with purplish-brown patches in comparison to the pale orange-brown variety. Although these specimens may appear to be a separate species, a series of specimens shows intermediate forms that connect the two extremes in colouration. The female of the species also vary but tend to be lighter than the males. Both the male and female have four dark lines across the forewing but these tend to be more visible in the female of the species with the forewings of the male only showing the first, third and fourth of these lines towards the leading edge of the wing.

Distribution
This species is endemic to New Zealand. It is found throughout New Zealand.

Habitat 
This species inhabits native forest and has been commonly found in dense forest ravines.

Life history and behaviour 
The egg of this species usually hatches after approximately three weeks. Larvae of this species are active during spring and summer. This species pupates on the soil amongst leaf litter and moss forming a thin cocoon in which to do so. Adults are on the wing throughout the year but are most common from September to March. They are active from dusk and are attracted to light. During the day adult moths can be observed resting on dead fern fronds and at night have been observed feeding on the blossoms of Metrosideros perforata.

Host species

The larvae feed on the fronds of fern species including Leptopteris hymenophylloides, Leptopteris superba, Adiantum cunninghamii, Polystichum vestitu,  Alsophila smithii, and the silver fern.

References

Moths described in 1862
Moths of New Zealand
Cidariini
Endemic fauna of New Zealand
Taxa named by Francis Walker (entomologist)
Endemic moths of New Zealand